The 1997 Harvard Crimson football team represented Harvard University in the 1997 NCAA Division I-AA football season. Harvard finished the season with an overall record of 9–1, winning the Ivy league with a conference mark of 7–0, the first time Harvard had ever gone unbeaten and untied in Ivy League play.

Schedule

References

Harvard
Harvard Crimson football seasons
Ivy League football champion seasons
Harvard Crimson football
Harvard Crimson football